Lisa Varga (born April 8, 1971) is an American actress, producer, writer, model, and TV host. Her acting roles include Homeland (2011), NBC television movie Game Time: Tackling the Past (2011) as Karen Walker, Marley & Me (2008), and won best actress as Janis McKenzie in  Armed and Deadly  at the Movieville International Film Festival. Lisa Varga is currently the host and producer of  Beyond The Offseason with Lisa Varga, a series about athletes and charity. She is also the creator, writer, producer, and host of a new music entertainment series called Nashville Live. Ms. Varga has her own production company, Lisa Varga Entertainment and has over twenty years of experience in the world of entertainment, music, and sports. 

Personal life
Born and raised in South Bend, Indiana, Varga graduated from John Adams High School. She started modeling at the age of 16, and appeared in various commercials, magazine covers, and calendars, then decided to pursue an acting career and moved to Los Angeles.

Lisa Varga dedicates her life to many philanthropic efforts and is the founder of Fight Club for Cancer, with her brother Shane Varga, who is a two-time cancer survivor of Hodgkins Lymphoma. Fight Club for Cancer is a non-profit organization that brings sports, entertainment and events together to raise awareness and support efforts to educate people about cancer. Her brother, Shane, was the inspiration behind  Beyond The Offseason with Lisa Varga  

Ms. Varga has also partnered up to create a charity concert series that will help raise awareness for mental health and wellness. The campaign is set to revolve around her new show Nashville Live.

Ms. Varga is also an advocate for the protection of animals, and she is involved in helping numerous animal charities. She is an advocate for children as well. Ms. Varga finds great passion and purpose in being a voice for the voiceless, and helping the innocent.

Career
In 2017, Lisa Varga created a music series called Nashville Live, which films in Nashville, TN and focuses on county music. Ms. Varga is the creator, writer, producer, and host. She also produced, and had an acting role in a full-length feature film called Crowning Jules, which was acquired by Sony Pictures, and has foreign and domestic distribution. Ms. Varga also has two additional full-length feature films currently in development, both based on a true story. One of the films called Fisher, Ms. Varga wrote the screenplay for. It tells the factual, and unbelievable events that happened surrounding a club football team in Rochester, New York. The other film is about the tragedy and effects of bullying.

In 2014, Lisa Varga began filming the pilot for the television series, Alexis Ronan , where she plays the title role, Alexis Ronan, a powerful attorney who searches to find justice for her missing son. She also began production on her new series  Beyond The Offseason with Lisa Varga , a show that features athletes, teams, and coaches giving back to charity in their offseason.

Her film and TV credits include Homeland (2011),  Game Time: Tackling the Past (2011) , the starring role in  Armed and Deadly  (2011) - and won the " Best Actress " award at the 2011 Movieville International Film Festival,  Marley & Me (2008), Austin Powers: The Spy Who Shagged Me (1999), America's Most Wanted:America Fights Back (1988), Rudy (1993), and Walker, Texas Ranger (1993).

Lisa Varga began her hosting career working as a sideline reporter for Friday Night Football, and then went on to co-host for a series called W - The Women's Show''. Varga was also a guest host on HSN, the Home Shopping Network.

Filmography

Film and Television

References

External links 
 

1971 births
20th-century American actresses
21st-century American actresses
American film actresses
American television actresses
Living people
Actors from South Bend, Indiana